The Journal of Sustainable Development of Energy, Water and Environment Systems is a quarterly peer-reviewed open-access scientific journal covering sustainability studies. The editor-in-chief is Neven Duić (University of Zagreb).

Abstracting and indexing
The journal is abstracted and indexed in the Emerging Sources Citation Index and Scopus.

References

External links

Sustainability journals
Publications established in 2013
English-language journals
Quarterly journals
Creative Commons Attribution-licensed journals